The 1878 St. Croix labor riot, locally also known as Fireburn, was a labor riot on Saint Croix, one of the Virgin Islands, then part of the Danish West Indies. The revolt started on October 1, 1878 and was suppressed after several days of looting and burning. Among the leaders were several women – "Queen Mary" Thomas, "Queen Agnes" Salomon, and "Queen Mathilda" McBean – who became known as "Queens of the Fireburn".

Events leading up to the riot
In July 1848, the slaves of Danish West Indies staged a protest and gained their freedom. For many laborers this freedom would be short-lived, as plantation owners quickly began devising new regulations. The now free laborers were forced, by law, to sign contracts which bound them and their families to the plantations on which they worked. By signing these contracts, the laborers became debt peons slaves again, in all but name.

Contract Day
In October 1878, laborers gathered in Frederiksted to demand higher wages and better working conditions. Although it was initially a peaceful gathering, the crowd began to become violent after rumors circulated, including a rumor that a laborer had been hospitalized, but was mistreated and died in police custody. The rioters threw stones and the Danish soldiers retaliated with gunfire. As violence escalated, the soldiers barricaded themselves inside a fort. Unable to scale the gates to access the fort, the rioters turned their focus on the town and began looting the town, using torches to burn many buildings and plantations.

On October 4, British, French, and American warships arrived and offered to help stop the riot. However, Governor Garde was confident he and his men had the situation under control, and turned the ships away, though some soldiers borrowed guns from the British ships. The next day, the Governor ordered all laborers to return to their plantations or be declared "rebels". Laborers were forbidden from leaving their plantations without written permission from the plantation owner. By mid-October, the riot had died down and peace was returning to the islands.

Queens of the Fireburn
Among the prominent leaders of the riot were three women, Mary "Queen Mary" Thomas, "Queen Agnes", and "Queen Mathilda." The three women were sentenced to jail, and served their terms in Denmark. A folk song from the 1880s, entitled "Queen Mary", was written about Mary's role in the riot.

In 2004, historian Wayne James uncovered Danish documents, including photographs of the prison where the women served their sentences, a storybook they wrote, and "a host of other historically significant documents and photos." According to him, these documents reveal the existence of a fourth "queen," Susanna Abramsen, who was known as "Bottom Belly."

Aftermath
The riots caused great destruction to property on the islands. 879 acres were burned, and the damage caused was estimated at hundreds of thousands of dollars. Direct casualties of the riot include the deaths of 60 black laborers and two soldiers, and 14 women who died in an explosion. In addition, 12 laborers were condemned to death and hanged on October 5 1878.

One year after the events of Fireburn, in October 1879, new contracts were written which would supposedly increase wages for laborers. However, these contracts were weighted in favor of the plantation owners, and thus resulted in little to no improvement in the laborers' lives.

Legacy
In 2018 artists Jeannette Ehlers and La Vaughn Belle unveiled a 7 meters (23 ft)-tall statue of Mary Thomas, seated on a throne with a cane knife and torch. Its installation in Copenhagen made the statue Denmark's first public monument to a black woman.

See also
 David Hamilton Jackson

References

Danish West Indies
1878 in the Caribbean
19th century in the Danish West Indies
Labor in the Caribbean
October 1878 events
1878 in Denmark